Ibrahim Salah Abdel Fattah (born on April 1, 1987) is an Egyptian footballer who plays as a midfielder.

Career

Salah left Zamalek SC on 1 July 2013, having played for the club in five years. He plays usually as a defensive midfielder, although he may be converted into a winger when needed. In February 2014, Salah was linked to a move to Sheffield United but rejoined Zamalek in April 2014, ending a one-year spell at the Saudi club Al-Orobah.

Salah scored his first international goal in the friendly against Uganda 3–0 victory on 14 August 2013.

In 2016 he joined Smouha SC on loan scoring 20 goals in 17 appearances.

He has since found goalscoring form for Zamalek scoring 30 in his first season back for the club.

After this clinical return to form many teams were vying for his signature but it was Arab Contractors FC who won the race for his signature. In 2019 he signed a four-year contract extension with the club.

Honours

Individual 
Awards
 Lebanese Premier League Team of the Year: 2011–12

References

1987 births
Living people
Egyptian footballers
Egypt international footballers
Egyptian expatriate footballers
Zamalek SC players
Expatriate footballers in Saudi Arabia
People from Mansoura, Egypt
Al-Orobah FC players
Smouha SC players
2017 Africa Cup of Nations players
Egyptian Premier League players
Saudi Professional League players
Egyptian expatriate sportspeople in Saudi Arabia
Association football midfielders